Spirit of '76 may refer to:
 Spirit of '76 (sentiment), patriotic sentiment engendered by the American Revolution
 The Spirit of '76 (painting), a painting by Archibald Willard
 Spirit of '76 (album), a 1975 album by Spirit
 Spirit of '76 (Marvel Comics), the name of a fictional comic book character from Marvel Comics, first introduced in 1977
 Spirit of '76 (Harvey Comics), the name of a fictional comic book character from Harvey Comics
 Spirit of 76 (pinball), a pinball game by Gottlieb
 The Spirit of '76, a pinball game by Mirco Games, Inc.
 The Spirit of '76 (1917 film), a silent film directed by Frank Montgomery
 The Spirit of '76 (1990 film), starring David Cassidy and Redd Kross
 Spirit of '76 (mango), a named mango cultivar that originated in south Florida
 Spirit of '76 (airplane), Richard Nixon's name for Air Force One
 "Spirit of '76", a song on the 1985 album Strength by Welsh band The Alarm
 "Spirit of '76", a song on the 2018 album Book of Bad Decisions by rock band Clutch